Linn Harrison Enslow (February 26, 1891 – November 3, 1957) was an American sanitary engineer and chemist, most famous for his work with Abel Wolman developing chlorination systems in Baltimore.

Life 

Enslow was born in Richmond, Virginia, to Linn Bliss Enslow and Marie (née Harrison) Enslow, the eldest of six children.

He died of a heart attack on his farm in Dublin, Virginia in 1957; at the time, he resided in Queens, New York, and was working as editor of the magazine Water and Sewage Works. He was buried in New Dublin Presbyterian Church Cemetery in Dublin, Virginia.

Work 

While studying chemistry at Johns Hopkins, he met Abel Wolman; together, the two devised a formula to appropriately chlorinate drinking water, depending on factors such as acidity. Between the time of discovery in 1919 and 1941, eighty-five percent of American water systems were using chlorination.

References 

1891 births
1957 deaths
20th-century American engineers
Engineers from Virginia
People from Richmond, Virginia
Johns Hopkins University alumni
American hydrologists
People from Dublin, Virginia
People from Queens, New York
Engineers from New York City